Melvin King may refer to:

 Mel King (born 1928), American politician, community organizer and writer
 Melvin King (footballer) (born 1985), Liberian football goalkeeper